Rhamphocetichthys savagei, Savage's bird-snouted whalefish, is a species of flabby whalefish found at depths of around .  It is the only known member of its genus.

References
 

Cetomimidae
Monotypic fish genera
Fish described in 1989